Saint Paul's Church National Historic Site is  a United States National Historic Site located in Mount Vernon, New York, just north of the New York City borough of The Bronx. The site was authorized in 1978 to protect Saint Paul's Church from increasing industrialization of the surrounding area. Saint Paul's Church is one of New York's oldest parishes and was used as a military hospital after the American Revolutionary War Battle of Pell's Point in 1776. The  cemetery surrounding the church is also within the historic site and contains an estimated 9,000 burials dating from 1704.

History of Saint Paul's Church

The parish that founded Saint Paul's Church was established in 1665. The first church at the site was a small, square, wooden structure built in 1695 and was known as the Church of Eastchester. The present day church was built in 1764, but its name was not changed to Saint Paul's Church until 1795.

Election of 1733

The election for an open seat in the New York assembly, held on the Village Green in Eastchester, Westchester County on October 29, 1733, is one of the better known political events in colonial America. Two hundred and seventy five years after the contest, historians continue to cite the election to advance various arguments about colonial life. One recent student used the election to argue for the persistent importance of monarchy in the outlook of colonists, while another scholar treated the voting as an important point in the development of political awareness among New York artisans. Many writers address the election, held at what is today St. Paul's Church National
Historic Site, in Mt. Vernon, as part of the story of the printer John Peter Zenger, whose acquittal in a seditious libel case in 1735 is seen as a foundation of the free press in America. The first issue of Zenger's New York Weekly Journal carried a lengthy report on the famous election, producing one of the few complete accounts of a colonial election available to historians.

Battle of Pell's Point

On October 18, 1776, the Revolutionary War Battle of Pell's Point was fought less than a mile from the church, and the church served as a hospital for the British Army following the battle. The church's tower contains a bell that was cast in 1758 at the same London foundry as the Liberty Bell. As the fighting began to move closer to the church, George Washington ordered the parishioners to bury the bell to prevent the British from melting it down and using it for ammunition. The bell still hangs in the tower today.

20th century and beyond
During the early part of the 20th century, the parish began to decline, and the last Sunday service held at Saint Paul's took place in May 1977.

The church (along with its carriage house, cemetery, and grounds) was designated as a National Historic Site on July 5, 1943 although not formally authorized until November 10, 1978.

Today, visitors can visit the church and the 225-year-old church tower on ranger-guided tours. The carriage house next to the church now serves as a museum and visitor center. The site was opened to the public in 1984 and is now operated by the National Park Service under a cooperative agreement with the Society of the National Shrine of the Bill of Rights at Saint Paul's Church, Eastchester.

Legacy
This significant site was added to the African American Heritage Trail of Westchester County in 2004 as part of a mission to “preserve and interpret the legacy and contributions that people of African descent have made to the development of our unique American identity.” It is one of only 14 such sites.

See also
National Register of Historic Places listings in southern Westchester County, New York

References

External links
National Park Service: Saint Paul's Church National Historic Site

African-American history of New York (state)
National Historic Sites in New York (state)
Episcopal church buildings in New York (state)
Churches on the National Register of Historic Places in New York (state)
National Register of Historic Places in Westchester County, New York
Historic American Buildings Survey in New York (state)
Mount Vernon, New York
Museums in Westchester County, New York
History museums in New York (state)
Churches completed in 1765
American Revolutionary War museums in New York (state)
Churches in Westchester County, New York
Protected areas established in 1978
1978 establishments in New York (state)
Religious organizations established in 1665
1665 establishments in the Province of New York
18th-century Episcopal church buildings
African-American history of Westchester County, New York